Buzzy and the Phantom Pinto is a 1941 American Western film directed by Richard C. Kahn and starring Robert 'Buzz' Henry, Dave O'Brien and Dorothy Short. It was the sequel to Buzzy Rides the Range, intended to be the beginning of a series although only two films were ever made.

Cast
 Robert 'Buzz' Henry as Buzzy Wade 
 Dave O'Brien as Jim Dana 
 Dorothy Short as Ruth Wade 
 George Morrell as Dude Bates 
 Sven Hugo Borg as Kurt F. Henck 
 Milburn Morante as Timothy Wade 
 Frank Merlo as Miller 
 Harry Norman as Hadley 
 Don Kelly as Lucas 
 Phil Arnold as The Stranger

References

Bibliography
 Pitts, Michael R. Western Movies: A Guide to 5,105 Feature Films. McFarland, 2012.

External links
 

1941 films
1941 Western (genre) films
1940s English-language films
American Western (genre) films
Films directed by Richard C. Kahn
1940s American films